The Little Thief is a 1988 French drama directed by Claude Miller. It is based upon an unfinished script by François Truffaut. Truffaut died before being able to direct the film himself. The film had 1,834,940 admissions in France. Set in the French countryside after the end of World War II, it tells the story of a 15-year-old girl abandoned by her parents, who is looking for love and independence but succumbs to stealing and sleeping with men.

Plot
Janine lives with her uncle and aunt, who have little sympathy for her as her mother left her to go with a lover to Italy and she never knew her father. She dreams of luxury, stealing American cigarettes and expensive underwear from shops. When found out, she leaves to become a live-in maid for the Longuets, a rich and friendly young couple. Tired after a long day's work, in the cinema she falls asleep on the shoulder of Michel, a married man in his forties keen on poetry and music. They start an affair, but he also tries to improve her culture and encourages her to study shorthand-typing. 

At her course she sees a young intruder robbing the office, but does not inform on him. This is Raoul, who waits outside for her and they too start an affair. He wants money to buy a motor bike for racing, and Janine supplies it by robbing her employers and their guests during a dinner party. The two young criminals go on the run, ending up living rough beside the sea. There Janine is arrested, and sent to a school for young offenders. She and another girl escape, but Janine is now wanted and has nowhere to go. She is also pregnant. After making an appointment with an illegal abortionist, in the cinema she sees a newsreel of soldiers off to the war in Indochina. Among them is Raoul, so she does not keep the appointment and an end caption says that her baby was coming on well.

Cast
 Charlotte Gainsbourg as Janine Castang
 Didier Bezace as Michel Davenne
 Simon de La Brosse as Raoul
 Clotilde de Bayser as Severine Longuet
 Raoul Billerey as Oncle André Rouleau
 Chantal Banlier as Tante Léa
 Nathalie Cardone as Mauricette
 Renée Faure as Mère Busato
 Chantal Neuwirth as The farmer
 Catherine Arditi as School director
 Dominique Besnehard
 Jacky Nercessian

Release
The Little Thief was released in 1988 in France.

References

External links
 
 

1989 films
1989 drama films
French drama films
1980s French-language films
Films directed by Claude Miller
Films with screenplays by François Truffaut
Films produced by Claude Berri
Films set in 1950
Teenage pregnancy in film
Juvenile sexuality in films
1980s French films